Asura floccosa is a moth of the family Erebidae. It is found in India (Sikkim, Calcutta, Ganjam, Madras, Coimbatore) and Sri Lanka.

Description
Its wingspan is about 22 mm. Antennae of male ciliated. Female has semi-diaphanous pale brownish-ochreous body. Forewings with indistinct sub-basal and medial fuscous bands. There is a spot on the discocellulars. Postmedial and marginal speck series present.

References

floccosa
Moths described in 1864
Moths of Asia
Moths of Sri Lanka